The chapters of the Japanese manga Fuuka, written and illustrated by Kōji Seo.

Volume list

References

Fuuka